Katharina Liensberger (born 1 April 1997) is an Austrian World Cup alpine ski racer, and specialises in the technical events of slalom and giant slalom.

Born in Feldkirch, Vorarlberg, Liensberger made her World Cup debut in January 2016 and gained her first podium in 2019; her first World Cup victories came in March 2021 and won the season title in slalom. A month earlier, she became the world champion in the slalom and parallel giant slalom.

World Cup results

Season titles
 1 title (1 Slalom)

Season standings

Race podiums
 3 wins – (3 SL)
 14 podiums – (13 SL, 1 GS)

World Championship results

Olympic results

References

External links 

Katharina Liensberger at Austrian Ski team official site 
 

1997 births
Living people
Austrian female alpine skiers
Alpine skiers at the 2018 Winter Olympics
Alpine skiers at the 2022 Winter Olympics
Olympic alpine skiers of Austria
Medalists at the 2018 Winter Olympics
Medalists at the 2022 Winter Olympics
Olympic medalists in alpine skiing
Olympic gold medalists for Austria
Olympic silver medalists for Austria
People from Feldkirch, Vorarlberg
Sportspeople from Vorarlberg
20th-century Austrian women
21st-century Austrian women